Free grace theology is a Christian soteriological view which holds that the only condition of salvation is initial faith. Free grace theologians reject the necessity of good works for salvation. Free Grace advocates believe that good works are not the condition to merit (as with Catholics), maintain (as with Arminians), or to prove (as with some Calvinists) salvation, but rather are part of discipleship and the basis for receiving eternal rewards. This view distinguishes between salvation and discipleshipthe call to believe in Christ as Savior and to receive the gift of eternal life, and the call to follow Christ and become an obedient disciple, respectively.

Free Grace theology is mainly taught among: Baptist, Plymouth Brethren, non-Denominationals and other Independent churches.

History

Early Church 
Augustine wrote a treatise against some in his day who believed that even if a justified Christian did no good works and sinned without repentance, he would still be saved but be saved "through fire".

Modern proponents 
Wayne Grudem notes that some Free grace advocates teach similar views as Robert Sandeman. Many modern Free Grace theologians were influenced by Lewish Sperry Chafer (February 27, 1871 – August 22, 1952) , whose doctrine also caused a controversy about justification, being similar to the Lordship salvation controversy, though smaller in scale. Free grace theology reemerged under this name in the late 20th century as a critical response to a perceived legalist abuse of the New Testament by Lordship salvation, Catholicism, and Calvinism. However similar ideas had arisen outside of the Lordship salvation controversy in some parts of the world, such as the German writer Erich Sauer had articulated Free grace views without major contact to major Free grace theologians such as Zane Hodges. Its more modern prominent proponents, academicians, and theologians include: 

Its prominent present-day expressions are Grace School of Theology, the Grace Evangelical Society, the Free Grace Alliance, and local churches.

Dallas Theological Seminary (DTS) 
Many modern proponents of free grace theology studied and taught at the Dallas Theological Seminary, including Charles Caldwell Ryrie, Zane C. Hodges, and Dave Anderson, though the seminary itself does not hold to free grace. A number of free grace churches are pastored by graduates of DTS. A number of opponents of free grace also graduated from DTS including Darrel Bock and Daniel Wallace.

Grace School of Theology (GSOT) 
Dave Anderson, former student and professor at Dallas Theological Seminary, established Grace School of Theology (originally Houston Theological Seminary) in 2001. Grace School of Theology "is committed to Christian scholarly endeavor in the free grace tradition." The school's vision is "To develop spiritual leaders in every nation who can teach others about the love of Christ, a love that cannot be earned and cannot be lost." The school is accredited by TRACS, ATS, and the ECFA with 14 teaching sites in the United States and internationally. Eight of the 36 faculty members trained at Dallas Theological Seminary. Grace School of Theology promotes the Free Grace position through its classes (with over 600 students internationally) and also through Grace Theology Press, which has published many resources related to Free Grace theology.

Free Grace Alliance (FGA) 
The Free Grace Alliance formed in November 2004 with an emphasis on international missions. Although the new organization was officially formed for a "different reason", the FGA split from GES in 2005 when most of the prominent leaders (including the chairman of the board) within GES rejected the change in the content of saving faith being taught by Zane C. Hodges and GES changed its doctrinal statement regarding the content of saving faith. A FGA statement of non-association with GES was made in 2009. Fred Lybrand as President of the Free Grace Alliance publicly rejected the Grace Evangelical Society view as false doctrine in 2009 and called for their repentance. The FGA holds annual conferences, and numerous local churches and Christian ministries are associated with the FGA as members or affiliates.

Grace Evangelical Society (GES) 
Founded in 1986 by Robert Wilkin, the Grace Evangelical Society focuses on publishing, podcasts, and conferences. GES was a focal point for the mainstream Free Grace movement until 2005, when it officially altered its beliefs statement to say that eternal life and eternal security are synonymous and that belief in eternal security provided by Jesus is the sole requirement for salvation.

Zane C. Hodges, a prominent Free Grace theologian, was a core theologian of the GES group until his death in 2008. In his later years, Zane Hodges controversially argued that the inclusion of Jesus' promise of eternal salvation was a necessity for proper evangelization. He viewed the sole condition of eternal salvation as believing in Jesus' promise of eternal life, and GES began to promote this view increasingly. In this view, a person could believe that Jesus is God and Savior who died and rose again, without believing in him for eternal salvation (faith in eternal security), and could therefore still be damned. A person could also become a Christian by believing in someone named Jesus for eternal security, while rejecting that he is God and Savior from sin by his death and resurrection. According to the GES website salvation comes from "faith alone in the Lord Jesus Christ, who died a substitutionary death on the cross for man’s sin and rose bodily from the dead"  However, GES proponents deny that a person must believe in the substitutionary death for sin and a bodily resurrection of Jesus to be a Christian. 

The change in GES's official doctrinal statement caused many members (including the chairman of the board) and the majority of academic members to leave GES in 2005–6. Almost all free grace academic theologians rejected the new statement, arguing that eternal life and eternal security are not the same thing. They also objected that this view would by consequence damn all Christians from the time of 100 A.D. until the 1500s, since there is no evidence that anyone believed in eternal security. John Niemelä of GES responded that the promise of eternal life was present during that time through the regular reading of the Gospel of John in the lectionaries. However, Wilson responded that Niemelä's contention was based on an informal logical fallacy and a heresy.

Beliefs

Core beliefs table 
Core beliefs common to Free Grace theology historically include:

Soteriology 
Free Grace theology is distinguished by its soteriology or doctrine of salvation. Its advocates believe that God justifies the sinner on the sole condition of faith in Christ, not righteous living. However, Free Grace writers generally agree that good works do not play a role in meriting, maintaining, or proving eternal life. In other words, Jesus graciously provides eternal salvation as a free gift to those who believe in Him.

Although in popular speech "salvation" is commonly used to refer to justification, Free Grace advocates point out that believers can experience “salvation” in a number of ways, from a number of things either physically or spiritually. As used in the Bible, “salvation” means “deliverance” and is not a technical term meaning "go to heaven." This can be demonstrated by Acts 27:34 where the Greek word soteria (typically translated as "salvation") is translated “health” or "strength" because food will assist their deliverance from physical death. Spiritually, salvation can refer to deliverance from the eternal penalty of sin (justification), the current power of sin over the Christian (sanctification), the removal of any possibility to sin (glorification), and being restored to stewardship over the world as God intended for humankind at creation (restoration to rule).

The Free Grace doctrine has been sometimes called "preservation of the sinner", as opposed to the Reformed doctrine of "perseverance of the saints", as Free Grace theology holds that works are neither a post-requirement of justification.

Epistle of James 
There are some differences among Free Grace theologians on the role of good works as necessary fruit due to their respective interpretations of the Epistle of James. Many Free Grace theologians such as Bob Wilkin, Zane Hodges, John F. Hart and Charlie Bing deny good works as being post-conditions of salvation, holding that when the epistle of James reads "can faith save him?", the letter is referring to "salvation" from temporal consequences of sin, though Bing interprets the "salvation" to refer to salvation from a loss of eternal rewards.  In contrast, Charles Ryrie, though being a Free grace theologian, believed that faith naturally leads into good works. Ryrie still held in opposition to Lordship salvation that the believer may not always have fruit nor the fruit be necessarily outwardly evident. Ryrie added that believers will have fruit "somehow, somewhere", but agreed that the category of "carnal Christian" is possible. Ryrie criticized the Lordship view of good works, as making people into "fruit inspectors". Some recent scholars have argued that Augustine erred in his view of James 2 that has led to the view that the "false faith of demons" lacks works while "true faith" must always produce good works.

Dispensationalism 
Modern Free Grace theology is typically, but not necessarily, dispensational in its assumptions regarding the philosophy of history and in terms of its networks and affiliations.

Assurance 
One of the unique aspects of free grace theology is its position on assurance. All free grace advocates agree that assurance of spending eternity with God is based on the promise of scripture through faith alone in Jesus Christ, and not one's works or subsequent progression in sanctification. This view strongly distinguishes the gift of eternal life (accompanying justification by faith) from discipleship (obedience). Free Grace teaches that a person does not need to promise disciplined behavior or good works in exchange for God's eternal salvation; thus, one cannot lose his or her salvation through sinning and potential failure, and that assurance is based on the Bible, not introspection into one's works. God declares persons righteous through Christ's perfection. Whatever little progress humans make towards perfection is infinitesimal compared to Christ's perfection. Thus, comparing one's progress towards perfection with another person's progress is viewed as unwise (2 Cor 10:12). Assurance is based on Christ's perfection given freely to believers (imputed righteousness) and not based on progressive steps of holiness. Dallas Theological Seminary sums up the general consensus of free grace theology in Article XI of its doctrinal statement, in reference to assurance:

We believe it is the privilege, not only of some, but of all who are born again by the Spirit through faith in Christ as revealed in the Scriptures, to be assured of their salvation from the very day they take Him to be their Savior and that this assurance is not founded upon any fancied discovery of their own worthiness or fitness, but wholly upon the testimony of God in His written Word, exciting within His children filial love, gratitude, and obedience (Luke 10:20; 22:32; 2 Cor. 5:1, 6–8; 2 Tim. 1:12; Heb. 10:22; 1 John 5:13).

A novel view proposed by Zane C. Hodges and accepted only by the Grace Evangelical Society is that assurance is of the essence of saving faith: "A careful consideration of the offer of salvation as Jesus Himself presented it, will show that assurance is inherent in that offer." This view holds that faith is, by definition, a conviction that what Jesus promises is true. If a person has never been sure that he had eternal life which could never be lost (i.e., sure that he was once-for-all justified, sure that he is going to heaven no matter what), then it is posited that he has not yet believed in Christ in the Biblical sense (cf. John 11:25-26 and Jesus' question, "Do you believe this?"). The majority of Free Grace advocates reject this novel view, because it requires only faith in eternal security for justification; yet, one need not believe in the person of Jesus Christ as God and Savior from sin.

Repentance 
Free grace theology approaches the doctrine of repentance in a different way than most other Christian traditions.

Harry A. Ironside ("Except Ye Repent", American Tract Society, 1937) and Lewis Sperry Chafer (Systematic Theology, completed 1947), among others, returned to consider the fundamental meaning of the Greek word metanoia (repentance), which simply means "to change one's mind." In biblical passages concerning eternal salvation, the object of repentance was often seen simply as Jesus Christ, making repentance equivalent to faith in Christ. Passages identifying a more specific object of repentance were understood to focus on man's need to change his mind from a system of self-justification by works to trusting in Christ alone for salvation, or a change in mind from polytheism to a belief in Jesus Christ as the true living God. Further exposition came from various free grace authors.

Zane C. Hodges and Robert Wilkin hold that repentance is defined as turning from one's sins, but repentance is not a requirement for eternal life, only faith in Christ. Robert N. Wilkin undertook a detailed examination in his doctoral dissertation at Dallas Theological Seminary (1985), which he simplified for a more popular audience in the Journal of the Grace Evangelical Society from Autumn 1988 to Autumn 1990. Hodges takes the position in Absolutely Free! (and in more detail in Harmony With God) that the process of repentance may be a preparatory step in coming to salvation, and should be evident in the life of a believer, but a lost man can be born again apart from repentance by any definition. Hodges also says that he no longer holds to the change of mind view of repentance. In Harmony with God, Hodges says that there is only one answer to the question “What must I do to be saved?” “Repentance is not part of that answer. It never has been and never will be.”

Content of saving faith 
Among Free Grace adherents there is general agreement about the nature of saving faith but not its content. The majority of Free Grace theologians hold that belief in Jesus Christ for eternal life must include belief in certain aspects of his person and work, such as one or more of the following: his deity, humanity, substitutionary death for sin and bodily resurrection. The doctrinal statement of Grace School of Theology (cited above) supports this view.

Free Grace theologians disagree on if "faith" includes trusting, Wilkin and Hodges would deny that faith includes trust, holding faith to merely be about intellectual assent, but others such as Bing hold that faith includes trust.

The Free Grace Alliance also states in its affirmations that the finished work of Jesus Christ's death and resurrection is essential to believe for eternal life: "Faith is a personal response, apart from our works, whereby we are persuaded that the finished work of Jesus Christ, His death and resurrection, has delivered us from condemnation and guaranteed our eternal life."

The more recent view of Zane Hodges and the Grace Evangelical Society considers it to be theological legalism to require (for eternal life) belief in Christ's deity, death for sin, and bodily resurrection since this would exceed the requirement of the minimal saving message to simply "believe in Jesus for everlasting life." This view seeks support mainly from passages in the Gospel of John that speak of Jesus guaranteeing everlasting life to all who believe in him for it (3:16; 5:24; 6:47; 11:25-27). According to this view, the Gospel of John is considered to be the only evangelistic book of the Bible written to bring people to belief in Jesus Christ for eternal life (20:30-31). While no direct biblical evidence for the requirement of belief in eternal security for justification has been put forth, proponents argue that (a) eternal life and eternal security are equivalent—unless you believe in eternal security you have never believed in Christ and (b) the term "Christ" means the One who guarantees eternal salvation to the believer (John 11:25-27). In this view of Hodges, Wilkin, and GES, all Catholics, Orthodox, Arminians and Calvinists are not Christians and are not saved because they do not believe in eternal security.

Comparison to the five points of Reformed Theology 

Free Grace contrasts with the teachings of Reformed Theology, which are often characterized by the acrostic “TULIP”.

The fundamental disagreement between Free Grace and Reformed theology is over humanity's ability to choose the good and believe God. Adherents to free grace point to verses such as Acts 17:27 that indicate non-believers can “grope for Him and find Him, though He is not far from each one of us.” Further, Free Grace advocates point out that the Bible is full of admonitions for human readers to make good choices. As an example, they point to Galatians 5:13 “For you, brethren, have been called to liberty; only do not use liberty as an opportunity for the flesh, but through love serve one another.” “Liberty” or freedom means the ability to make choices for yourself. This verse admonishes believers to make good choices, and acknowledges they can make a choice to follow the Spirit or the flesh. The balance of the passage speaks of the consequences of giving priority to the flesh (human lusts) or the Holy Spirit. Adherents to Free Grace theology maintain that all believers have the power to overcome sin through the indwelling Holy Spirit, but have a choice whether to use that power.
The “TULIP” doctrines were brought into Christianity by Augustine of Hippo starting in 412 CE during his conflict with the Pelagians. Free Grace theologians argue that Augustine erred in departing from his prior traditional Christian doctrines to form Augustinian Calvinism, and this in turn influenced Calvin. Free Grace theology opposes each of these doctrines as countering the teachings of the Bible as well as the teachings of early church fathers prior to Augustine.

Opposition 
Free Grace concerns have ignited four major disputes: the "Majoristic controversy" (16th century Protestant Reformation), the "Antinomian Controversy" (17th century), the "Lordship controversy" (20th century), and what has been called the "Crossless Gospel Controversy" (21st century). Some historic Christian denominations, like the Lutheran Churches and Reformed Churches, regard free grace theology as a lesser gospel. Other denominations have historically regarded grace as free, like Baptists.

Lordship Salvation and the Reformed (Calvinist) tradition are opposing views, as held by John MacArthur, Darrel Bock, and Daniel Wallace. The Reformed tradition holds that people cannot generate saving faith because they are by nature fallen and opposed to God. They believe that God's grace enables a sinner to overcome his fallen will and gives him saving faith in Jesus. A heavy emphasis is placed on proving the validity of one's faith by outward and inward moral conduct. Noted Reformed theologian Wayne Grudem wrote a book for the specific purpose of refuting Free Grace theology and defending the core tenets of Reformed theology. Shortly after its release, Grudem's book was countered in A Defense of Free Grace Theology edited by Fred Chay, his former colleague at Phoenix Seminary. The Foundation of Augustinian–Calvinism also argues against the Lordship/Calvinist view by attempting to show the ancient Manichaean, Neoplatonic, and Stoic errors in Augustinian-Calvinism.

See also
 Dispensationalist theology
 Grace Evangelical Society
 Lordship salvation controversy
 Marrow Controversy
 Sola fide

Notes

References

External links

 Grace Abroad Ministries
 Grace Biblical Seminary
 Grace Theology Press
 Grace Evangelical Society
 Free Grace Alliance
 Chafer Theological Seminary
 Grace School of Theology
 GraceLife Ministries
 Grace Church of Sahuarita

Grace in Christianity
Christian terminology
Christian theological movements
Evangelical theology
Salvation in Protestantism